Rampur Birta may refer to:

Rampur Birta, Janakpur
Rampur Birta, Sagarmatha